Hednota odontoides is a moth in the family Crambidae. It was described by L. E. Koch in 1966. It is found in Australia, where it has been recorded from Western Australia.

References

External links
Original description: 

Crambinae
Moths described in 1966